We Go Way Back is a 2006 American film directed and written by Lynn Shelton and starring Aaron Blakely, Maggie Brown, Basil Harris, Amber Hubert and Robert Wright.

Plot
A young woman who has just been offered her first leading role as an actress is confronted by the specter of her thirteen-year-old self. The dialog between the 23-year-old actress and her younger self begins in memory, and then climaxes in an apparitional experience with the specter of her own, repressed, precocious youth.

Cast
 Aaron Blakely – Jeff
 Maggie Brown – Kate-at-13
 Basil Harris – Pete
 Amber Hubert – Kate-at-23
 Robert Hamilton Wright – The Director
 Sullivan Brown – Jeremy
 Russell Hodgkinson – Frank

Production
The film began shooting in 2004 in Seattle.

In 2009, the company Geisha Years LLC was formed by Shelton specifically to purchase the film from TFC Productions 1, LLC, which was the original producer for the film. Geisha plans to secure a distribution deal for the film.

Reception and awards
 Kodak Vision Award for Best Cinematography – 2006 Slamdance Film Festival
 Grand Jury Award for Best Narrative Feature – 2006 Slamdance Film Festival

We Go Way Back has been described by critics as "polished" and "impressionistic".

References

External links
 
 New York Times review

2006 films
Films directed by Lynn Shelton
2006 directorial debut films
Films shot in Washington (state)
Films shot in Seattle
2000s English-language films